This is a list of notable rap music artists that are from Los Angeles, California.

A
 Ab-Soul
 Afroman
 Ak'Sent
 Akwid
 Aloe Blacc
 The Alchemist
 The Alkaholiks
 Anderson .Paak
 Arabian Prince

B
 B-Real
 Bad Azz
 Big Fase 100
 Big Syke
 Bino Rideaux
 The Black Eyed Peas
 Blueface
 Blu
 Boo-Yaa T.R.I.B.E.
 Brownside
 Busdriver
 Blxst

C
 Captain Murphy
 Captain Rapp
 Casey Veggies
 Chali 2na
 clipping.
 Coolio
 Cozz
 Crooked I
 Cypress Hill
 Charizma

D
 The D.O.C.
 Damu Ridas
 Daz Dillinger
 Deuce
 Dilated Peoples
 DJ Mustard
 DJ Pooh
 DJ Quik
 DJ Yella
 Doja Cat
 Dom Kennedy
 Domo Genesis
 Drakeo the Ruler
 Dr. Dre
 Dresta
 Dudley Perkins
 Dumbfoundead

E
 Earl Sweatshirt
 Tha Eastsidaz
 Eazy-E
 Egyptian Lover
 Eligh
 Emcee N.I.C.E.
 Evidence
 Exile

F
 Fatlip
 Fergie
 Freestyle Fellowship
 Frank Ocean

G
 The Game
 Giant Panda
 Gift of Gab
 The Grouch
 Guerilla Black
 03 Greedo

H
 Haiku D'Etat
 Hodgy Beats
 Hollywood Undead
 Hopsin

I
 Ice Cube
 Ice-T
 Imani

J
 J-Ro
 Jay Rock
 Joey Fatts
 Jurassic 5
 Justin Warfield

K
 Kendrick Lamar
 Kid Frost
 Kid Ink
 King Lil G
 King Tee
 Knoc-turn'al
 Kokane
 Kurupt
 Kyle

L
 L.A. Symphony
 L.A.M.B
 Lil Eazy-E
 Lootpack

M
 Mack 10
 Madlib
 MC Eiht
 MC Ren
 MC Trouble
 Mellow Man Ace
 Mike G
 Mike Shinoda
 Murs
 myka9
 Mila J

N
 Nipsey Hussle
 Nichkhun
 Nocando
 N.W.A

O
 Oh No
 O.T. Genasis
 OhGeesy
 Overdoz

P
 Pac Div
 People Under The Stairs
 The Pharcyde
 Pigeon John
 Problem
 Psycho Realm
 Psychosiz

R
 Ras Kass
 RBX
 Remble
 RJ
 Roddy Ricch

S
 Schoolboy Q
 Sen Dog
 Skeme
 Slimkid3
 Snoop Dogg
 South Central Cartel
 Spider Loc
 Vince Staples
 swizZz
 Shoreline Mafia

T
 Thurzday
 Too Short
 Tweedy Bird Loc 
 Tyga
 Tyler, The Creator
 Ty Dolla Sign

U
 Uncle Jamm's Army
 U-N-I
Ugly Duckling

W
 WC
 Warren G

X
 Xzibit

Y
 YG
 Yeat
 Young Dre the Truth

Z
 Zack de la Rocha

See also
 
 
 

 
Lists of hip hop musicians
Rappers
Lists of American musicians
West Coast hip hop